Mochalishche is the name of several rural localities in Russia:
Mochalishche, Kirov Oblast, a village in Adyshevsky Rural Okrug of Orichevsky District in Kirov Oblast; 
Mochalishche, Mari El Republic, a settlement under the administrative jurisdiction of Suslonger Urban-Type Settlement in Zvenigovsky District of the Mari El Republic; 
Mochalishche, Tver Oblast, a village in Dmitrovskoye Rural Settlement of Selizharovsky District in Tver Oblast;